Kundagannada or Kundaapra Kannada or Kundapura Kannada is a dialect of Kannada spoken in Kundapura, Byndoor, Brahmavar, Hebri taluks of Udupi district, Karnataka.
ಕುಂದಕನ್ನಡ ಇದು ಕೇವಲ ಭಾಷೆ ಅಲ್ಲ
ಇದು ಕುಂದಾಪ್ರ ಜನರ ಬದುಕು.
ಕುಂದಕನ್ನಡಕೆ ತನ್ನದೆ ಆದ ಒಂದು ಸ್ಥಾನಮಾನ ಇದೇ
ಇದು ತನ್ನದೆ ಆದಾ ಮಹತ್ವವನ್ನು ಹೊಂದಿದೆ.
ಕುಂದಕನ್ನಡವನ್ನು ಮುಖ್ಯವಾಗಿ ಬ್ರಹ್ಮಾವರ, ಕುಂದಾಪುರ, ಬೈಂದೂರ, ಹೆಬ್ರಿ,ತಾಲೂಕಿನ ಜನರ ಆಡು ಭಾಷೆ ಆಗಿದೆ... ಅಲ್ದೇ ಈ ಭಾಷೆ ಮಾತನಾಡುವ ಜನರು ದೇಶ ವಿದೇಶ ಸಹ ಬಹುಸಂಖ್ಯೆ ನೆಲೆಸಿರುತ್ತಾರೆ. ಅನೇಕ ಮಹಾನುಭಾವರು ಈ ನೆಲದಲ್ಲಿ ಹುಟ್ಟಿ ದೇಶ ವಿದೇಶದಲ್ಲಿ ಕೀರ್ತಿಪತಾಕೆ ಹಾರಿಸಿರುತಾರೆ.ಅವರಲ್ಲಿ ಕೆಲವರನ್ನು ಇಲ್ಲಿ ಸ್ಮರಿಸ ಬಹುದು...
ICIC Bank ನ ಕೆ.ವಿ ಕಾಮತ್, ಕೋಟ ಶಿವರಾಮ ಕಾರಂತ, ಪ್ರಕಾಶ ಪಡುಕೋಣೆ, ದೀಪಿಕಾ ಪಡುಕೋಣೆ, ಕಾಶಿನಾಥ್, ಉಪೇಂದ್ರ, ರಿಷಬ್ ಶೆಟ್ಟಿ, ರವಿ ಬಸ್ರುರ್,
ಇನ್ನು ಪ್ರಮುಖ ಇದಾರೆ...
ಈ ನೆಲದಲ್ಲಿ ಹುಟ್ಟಿಬೆಳೆದ ಬಹುತೇಕ ಜನರು ದೇಶ ವಿದೇಶದಲ್ಲಿ ಹೋಟೆಲ್ ಮತ್ತು ಬೇಕರಿ ಉದ್ಯೋಗದಲ್ಲಿ ತೊಡಗಿಕೊಂಡಿರುತ್ತಾರೆ.

References

External links 
 Kundapura Kannada Dictionary

Tulu Nadu
Culture of Tulu Nadu
Udupi